Frans Oskar (Oskari) Vihantola (25 January 1876, in Pomarkku – 25 August 1936; surname until 1906 Grönroos) was a Finnish bookseller, newspaper editor, lay preacher and politician. From 1 June to 14 September 1909, he was a member of the Parliament of Finland, representing the Christian Workers' Union of Finland (SKrTL).

References

1876 births
1936 deaths
People from Pomarkku
People from Turku and Pori Province (Grand Duchy of Finland)
Finnish Lutherans
Christian Workers' Union of Finland politicians
Members of the Parliament of Finland (1909–10)
Lutheran socialists